Yahyaabad (also Romanized as Yaḩyáābād) is a village in Tabas Rural District, in the Central District of Khoshab County, Razavi Khorasan Province, Iran. At the 2006 census, its population was 20, in 9 families.

References 

Populated places in Khoshab County